The 1962 Copa del Generalísimo Final was the 60th final of the Copa del Rey. The final was played at Santiago Bernabéu Stadium in Madrid, on 8 July 1962, being won by Real Madrid, who beat Sevilla 2–1.

Details

References

1962
Copa
Real Madrid CF matches
Sevilla FC matches